Tadeusz Puder (July 8, 1908 – January 27, 1945) was a Polish Roman Catholic priest of Jewish origin.

Biography
Puder was born in a Jewish family. At the age of 9, he was baptized. Puder attended the Adam Mickiewicz State Junior High School. In 1928, he joined the Archdiocesan Seminary of Warsaw. On October 18, 1932, he was ordained priest. Then he studied theology and was sent to the Pontifical Biblical Institute in Rome. In 1937, Puzer started to work at the parish in Rzeczyca. Then he was transferred to the parish of Saint James the Apostle in Warsaw.

In June 1938, he was appointed rector – vicar of the Saint Hyacinth in Warsaw. Puzer replaced Stanisław Trzeciak, a well-known priest of National Democracy in Poland. From that moment on, he became the subject of a campaign of hatred on the part of the extreme right wing, and indignation aroused of his Jewish origin of Pudra. On July 3, 1938, a few weeks after the appointment, Puder was slapped during the mass by a man who shouted, "This is a Jew!". The perpetrator was detained and battered by the faithful. The beating caused controversy. The Catholic press, Voice of the Nation and Small Journal, condemned the assault. The national paper, Prosto z mostu, blamed the Catholic Church for the incident which, according to journalists, should not appoint people of Jewish origin as priests, because a person who "grew up in a Jewish atmosphere" cannot be Polish, even if he was baptized.

After the outbreak of the war, priest Puder left Warsaw. He worked in Białołęka in the chapel of the Franciscan Sisters of the Family of Mary who ran the orphanage. On April 24, 1941, after the denunciation of priest Stanisław Trzeciak, Puder was arrested by the Gestapo on charges of not carrying out the armband, which, according to German decrees, should be worn by all Jews. On September 1, 1941, he was sentenced to one year and eight months in prison. Due to the deteriorating state of health he went to the prison hospital, from where, thanks to the help of nuns, he managed to escape on November 12, 1942. Until his liberation, he was hiding in Białołęka at the Franciscan Sisters of the Family of Mary. After the liberation, he went to Warsaw.

On January 23, 1945, he had a car accident, as a result of which he died in hospital on January 27, 1945.

References

1908 births
1945 deaths
Converts to Roman Catholicism from Judaism
Clergy from Warsaw
Polish people of Jewish descent
Road incident deaths in Poland
20th-century Polish Roman Catholic priests